The Folsom Flint and Other Curious Tales is a collection of stories by American writer David H. Keller. It was released in 1969 by Arkham House in an edition of 2,031 copies.  It was the author's second book to be published by Arkham House.

Contents

The Folsom Flint and Other Curious Tales contains the following:

 "In Memoriam: David H. Keller", by Paul Spencer
 "Unto Us a Child is Born"
 "The Golden Key"
 "The Question"
 "The Red Death"
 "The White City"
 "The Pent House"
 "Air Lines"
 "Chasm of Monsters"
 "Dust in the House"
 "The Landslide"
 "The Folsom Flint"
 "The Twins"
 "Sarah"
 "Fingers in the Sky"
 "The Thing in the Cellar"
 "A Piece of Linoleum"
 "The Dead Woman"

Sources

1969 short story collections
Fantasy short story collections
Science fiction short story collections by David H. Keller
Horror short story collections